Episode 9 may refer to:

 Star Wars: The Rise of Skywalker also known as Star Wars: Episode IX – The Rise of Skywalker, a 2019 film 
 "Episode 9" (Twin Peaks), a 1990 episode of the TV series Twin Peaks

See also
 Episode (disambiguation)
 9 (disambiguation)